Sonora palarostris, commonly known as the Sonoran shovelnose snake, is a species of small nonvenomous colubrid which is a native of the Sonoran Desert in North America.

Etymology
The specific name, palarostris, is from Latin: pāla (shovel) and rōstrum (beak or snout).

Geographic range
S. palarostris is found in the southwestern United States and northwestern Mexico. In the United States it is found only in Organ Pipe Cactus National Monument of western Pima County, Arizona. The subspecies occurring there is called the Organ Pipe shovelnose snake (C. p. organica). In Mexico it is found only in the state of Sonora.

Description
S. palarostris is cross-banded with black, yellow (or whitish), and red bands. Consequently, it resembles the Sonoran coral snake (Micruroides euryxanthus). The mnemonic "red on yellow kill a fellow, red on black, friend of Jack" doesn't work with this snake. However, unlike the coral snake, which has a black snout, Sonora palarostris has a yellow snout and is not venomous. Also on a coral snake, the bands go all the way around, but S. palarostris has a solid yellow belly.

The smooth dorsal scales are arranged in 15 rows at midbody; ventrals, 141–181; subcaudals, 34–64, divided.

Subspecies
Two subspecies are recognized, including the nominotypical subspecies.

Sonora palarostris organica Klauber, 1951 - Organ Pipe shovelnose snake
Sonora palarostris palarostris (Klauber, 1937) - Sonoran shovelnose snake

Behavior
S. palarostris is active in the evening and at night, mostly near washes.

References

Further reading
 Klauber, L.M. 1937. A New Snake of the Genus Sonora from Mexico. Trans. San Diego Soc. Nat. Hist. 8 (27): 363–366. ("Sonora palarostris sp. nov." )
 Klauber, L.M. 1951. The Shovel-Nosed Snake, Chionactis, with Descriptions of Two New Subspecies. Trans. San Diego Soc. Nat. Hist. 11 (9): 141–204. ("Chionactis palarostris organica, subsp. nov.", pp. 178–181.)
Stebbins, R.C. 2003. A Field Guide to Western Reptiles and Amphibians, Third Edition. The Peterson Field Guide Series. Houghton Mifflin. Boston and New York. xiii + 533 pp.  (paperback). (Chionactis palarostris, pp. 394–395 + Plate 45 + Map 171.)

External links
Chionactis palarostris at ITIS Report
Chionactis palarostris at Discover Life

Fauna of the Sonoran Desert
Sonora (snake)
Reptiles described in 1937
Fauna of the Southwestern United States
Snakes of Central America